A gubernatorial election was held on 29 July 2012 to elect the next governor of , a prefecture of Japan in the Chūgoku region of the main island of Honshu.

Sekinari Nii (LDP), who had held office since 1996, did not stand for re-election.

Candidates 
Shigetaru Yamamoto, former bureaucrat of the ministry of Transports, endorsed by LDP and New Komeito.
Tetsunari Iida, engineer, anti-nuclear and pro renewable energy. Backed by the SDP and the JCP.
Tsutomu Takamura, former member of the House of Representatives for the DPJ.
Shigeyuki Miwa, physician, former Director of Health Promotion Division of the Yamaguchi Prefecture.

Results

References 

2012 elections in Japan
Yamaguchi gubernational elections